Hallways is the fifth studio album by American rapper Homeboy Sandman. It was released by Stones Throw Records on September 2, 2014.

Critical reception 

At Metacritic, which assigns a weighted average score out of 100 to reviews from mainstream critics, the album received an average score of 79, based on 5 reviews, indicating "generally favorable reviews".

In a review for Cuepoint, Robert Christgau said Homeboy Sandman's perspective on "America, the Beautiful" was refreshing "from a man who's always been as class-conscious as alt-rap gets", while "Personal Ad" deeming "a sex boast few this side of Jay-Z would have the cool or balls to pull off".

Track listing

Personnel
Credits adapted from liner notes.

 Homeboy Sandman – vocals
 DJ Spinna – production (1)
 Jonwayne – production (2, 4)
 Blu – guest appearance (3)
 2 Hungry Bros. – production (3)
 J57 – production (5)
 Oh No – guest appearance (6), production (6)
 Knxwledge – production (7)
 Sobermindedmusic – production (8)
 Professor Brian Oblivion – production (9)
 SOL626 – production (10)
 Jozef van Wissem – guest appearance (11), production (11)
 J-Live – guest appearance (12)
 Kurious – guest appearance (12)
 Inspirmentalist – production (12)
 Peanut Butter Wolf – executive production
 Alejandro "Sosa" Tello – recording, mixing, mastering
 Andrew Huffman – artwork
 Lauren Jaslow – photography
 Jeff Jank – design

References

External links
 
 

2014 albums
Homeboy Sandman albums
Stones Throw Records albums
Albums produced by DJ Spinna
Albums produced by Oh No (musician)
Albums produced by J57
Albums produced by Knxwledge